The 183rd Field Artillery Battalion (Colorado) was a Field Artillery Battalion of the Army National Guard.

History
Unfortunately there were two units issued this number this is the Colorado unit. The Idaho Unit predates the Colorado unit.

Lineage
Constituted 10 May 1946 as Company C, 199th Engineer Combat Battalion and allotted to the Colorado National Guard
 Organized and Federally recognized 12 March 1948 at La Junta.
 Converted and redesignated 15 December 1949 as Company M, 157th Infantry
Converted and redesignated 1 August 1955 as Headquarters and Headquarters Battery, 183rd Field Artillery Battalion, concurrently, remainder of battalion organized from existing units as follows
 192nd Engineer Company at Trinidad redesignated as Battery A.
 Tank Company 157th Infantry at Las Animas redesignated as Battery C.
 Headquarters and Headquarters Company 3rd battalion 157th Infantry at Lamar redesignated Service Battery
Consolidated with 157th Field Artillery Regiment (United States) 1 February 1959

Campaign streamers
none

Decorations
none

Current units
unit broken up

Coat of arms
 Shield
Per fess embattled Gules and Or in chief two wigwams of the second garnished of the first and in base a sea lion brandishing a sword in dexter paw of the last. all within a bordure counterchanged
 Crest
That for the regiments and separate battalions of the Colorado Army National Guard
 Background
The coat of arms is that of the 157th Infantry within a border to indicate descent from that regiment.

See also
 Division insignia of the United States Army
 United States Army branch insignia
 United States Army Aviation Branch
 Coats of arms of U.S. Army Aviation Regiments
 List of armored and cavalry regiments of the United States Army
 Field Artillery Branch (United States)
 U.S. Army Regimental System

References

 Historical register and dictionary of the United States Army, from ..., Volume 1 By Francis Bernard Heitman 
 Encyclopedia of United States Army insignia and uniforms By William K. Emerson (page 51).
   lineage

External links
 http://www.history.army.mil/html/forcestruc/lineages/branches/av/default.htm 

Field artillery battalions of the United States Army
Military units and formations established in 1955